Rory Denzil Cox (born 1991 in England) is an English former first-class cricketer.

Cox was born at Winchester in 1991. He was educated at Eton College, before going up to Collingwood College, Durham. While studying at Durham, he played two first-class cricket matches for Durham MCCU against Durham and Nottinghamshire in 2013. He scored 20 runs in his two matches, in addition to taking 3 wickets with his left-arm medium pace bowling.

References

External links

1991 births
Living people
Cricketers from Winchester
People educated at Eton College
Alumni of Collingwood College, Durham
English cricketers
Durham MCCU cricketers